The St. Spyridon Parish of South East Sydney is the Greek Orthodox parish presence in the south-east region of Sydney, New South Wales, Australia. The parish functions through the authority of the Greek Orthodox Archdiocese of Australia, which derives its jurisdiction from the Ecumenical Patriarch of Constantinople.

Overview 

The church was built from 1961 in stages in the simplified East Mediterranean style, flanked by twin towers, designed by M Z Avramidis, and completed in 1973. The colourful iconography within was painted by a Greek artist. A tablet in front of the church was unveiled by the Governor of New South Wales in July 1975 to commemorate Australian Greek soldiers who made the supreme sacrifice in World War I and World War II.

The church is listed on the Randwick local government heritage register.
 
The parish has the vital responsibility for being the founder and having executive authority over St Spyridon College.

Priests

Parish Priests
 Father Elias Economou (1961- October 1975)
 Father Steven Scoutas (October 1975-present)

Assistant Priests
 Father Nicholas Bozikis (1988-1993)
 Father Agathangelo Masteas
 Father Sotirios Papafilopoulos (2004-2007)
 Deacon Evmenios Vasilopoulos (April 2007-December 2007)
 Father Andrew Joannou
 Father Sotiris Drapaniotis (-March 2019)
 Father Amphilohios Papantoniou (March 2019-November 2022)
 Deacon Chris Baghos (December 2022-February 2023)
 Father Irenaeus Triantis (April 2022-February 2023)
 Father Stavros Ivanos (March 2023-present)

See also 

 Australian non-residential architectural styles
 Greek Australians
 Greek Orthodox Archdiocese of Australia and New Zealand
 Greek Orthodox churches in New South Wales

References

Further reading

External links 

 

Eastern Orthodoxy in Australia
Greek-Australian culture in Sydney
1961 establishments in Australia
Churches completed in 1961